Lists of baronies include:
 List of baronies in the peerages of Britain and Ireland
 List of Polish noble families with the title of Baron
 List of baronies in Portugal

See also 

 List of barons in the peerages of Britain and Ireland
 Barony (county division)
List of baronies of Ireland
 Feudal baron